Walter Bennett (born 18 March 1997) is an Aruban international footballer who plays for SV Racing Club Aruba as a midfielder.

Club career
Bennett has played club football with Excelsior Maassluis and SV Racing Club Aruba.

International career
He received his first international call-up to the Aruba national team in September 2018, making his debut on 9 September 2018 in a game against Bermuda. He received a second call-up in October 2018.

References

1997 births
Living people
Aruban footballers
Aruba international footballers
Excelsior Maassluis players
SV Racing Club Aruba players
Tweede Divisie players
Association football midfielders
2015 CONCACAF U-20 Championship players
Aruba under-20 international footballers